Gungu is a Bantu language spoken by the Gungu (or Bagungu) people in western Uganda.

Writing system

References

Languages of Uganda
Great Lakes Bantu languages